Cercospora apii  is a fungal plant pathogen, who causes leaf spot on celery, and found on other plants, including Impatiens. Since the genus Cercospora is one of the largest and most heterogeneous genera of hyphomycetes, numerous species described from diverse hosts and locations are morphologically indistinguishable from C. apii and subsequently are referred to as C. apii sensu lato.

See also
 Cercospora apii f.sp. clerodendri

References

apii
Fungal plant pathogens and diseases
Eudicot diseases